Auris  is a genus of small to medium-sized tropical or sub-tropical, air-breathing land snails, pulmonate gastropod mollusks in the subfamily Bulimulinae within the family Bulimulidae.

Species
Species in the genus Bulimulus include:
 Auris bernardii (L. Pfeiffer, 1856)
 Auris bilabiata (Broderip & G. B. Sowerby I, 1830)
 Auris brachyplax Pilsbry, 1896
 Auris chrysostoma (Moricand , 1836)
 Auris egregia (Jay, 1836)
 Auris icterostoma (E. v. Martens, 1901)
 Auris illheocola (Moricand , 1836)
 Auris melanostoma (Moricand , 1836)
 Auris melastoma (Swainson, 1820)
 Auris nigrilabris Pilsbry, 1896
Species brought into synonymy
 Auris distorta (Bruguière, 1789): synonym of Plekocheilus distortus (Bruguière, 1789)
 Auris signata Spix in Wagner, 1827: synonym of Otostomus signatus (Spix in Wagner, 1827) (basionym)

References

External links
 Wagner J.A. (1827). Testacea fluviatilia quae in itinere per Brasiliam annis MDCCCXVII-MDCCCXX [1817-1820 jussu et auspiciis Maximiliani Josephi I. Bavariae Regis augustissimi suscepto, collegit et pingenda curavit Dr. J. B. de Spix (...), digessit, descripsit et observationibus illustravit Dr. J. A. Wagner. Munich: C. Wolf. pp. i-iv, 1-36, plates 1-29]
 Beck, H. (1837). Index molluscorum praesentis aevi musei principis augustissimi Christiani Frederici. 1-124. Hafniae
 Breure, A. S. H. & Araujo, R. (2017). The Neotropical land snails (Mollusca, Gastropoda) collected by the “Comisión Científica del Pacífico.”. PeerJ. 5, e3065

Bulimulidae